The 2015–16 Israeli Basketball State Cup was the 56th edition of the national cup tournament of Israeli basketball. Maccabi Tel Aviv took the title, and won its 7th straight State Cup title.

Bracket

Final

References 

2015-16
State Cup